The National Cemetery in Martin, Slovakia is the final resting place of many important personalities of Slovak history. The list includes writers, poets, national activists, pedagogues, etc.

The reason why Martin was selected as the site for the National Cemetery was its role as the center of Slovak culture during the years of formation of the Slovak nation (19th century).

List of notable burials

 Juraj Antal – doctor-physiologist
 Július Barč-Ivan – writer
 Martin Benka – painter
 Ján Bodenek – writer
 Emanuel Teodor Bohm – supporter of Slovak literature in the United States
 Mária Bohmová-Dziaková – supporter of Slovak literature in the United States
 Ján Bulík – chairman of Matica Slovenská in Yugoslavia
 Blažej Bulla – architect and folklorist
 Juraj J. Cincík – sacral painter
 Jozef Cíger Hronský – writer
 Samuel Czambel – linguist
 Ferdinand Čatloš – generál, minister
 Štefan Marko Daxner – activist
 Matúš Dula – politician
 Mikuláš Štefan Ferienčík – journalist and writer
 Ján Francisci-Rimavský – activist
 Mikuláš Galanda – painter
 Michal Gašparík – author of chronicles
 Želmíra Gašparíková – translator
 Janka Guzová-Becková – singer, collector of folk songs
 Andrej Halaša – national and cultural worker
 Maša Haľamová – poet
 František Hečko – writer
 Mária Jančová-Hečková – writer
 Naďa Hejná – actress
 Milan Hodža – politician, prime minister of the ČSR, acting president of ČSR
 Ferdinand Hoffmann – theatrician
 Emil Horváth – actor
 Ján Hrušovský – writer and journalist
 Svetozár Hurban Vajanský – writer
 Anna Hurbanová-Jurkovičová – first Slovak actress
 A. Ilečka – sculptor
 Janko Jesenský – writer
 Ferdinand Juriga – activist
 Ján Kadavý – activist, publisher and composer
 František Kalina – editor and translator
 František Kalina Jr. – visual artist
 Ján Kalinčiak – writer
 Andrej Kmeť – collector, organizer of scientific life
 Jozef Kohút – organizer of the fire-brigade movement
 Janko Kráľ – poet
 Štefan Krčméry – poet
 Martin Kukučín – poet
 Karol Kuzmány – writer
 Andrej Lettrich – director and screenplay writer
 Jozef Lettrich – politician
 Cyprián Majerník – painter
 Elena Maróthy-Šoltésová – writer
 Ján Meličko – composer
 Hana Meličková – actress
 Danko Michaelli – actor
 Milan Mitrovský – painter and writer
 Pavol Mudroň – representative of the Slovak National Movement
 Štefan Nemčok – painter
 Karol Novák – conductor
 Jozef Pajtaš – eye surgeon
 Viliam Pauliny-Tóth – writer, journalist, politician
 P. Peressenyi – architect
 Ján Petrikovich – doctor
 Ambro Pietor – journalist, national activist
 Karol Plicka – photographer
 Belo Polla – historian
 Daniel Rapant – historian
 Vladimír Roy – poet
 Viliam Ruttkay-Nedecký – painter
 Miloslav Schmidt – organizer of the fire-brigade movement
 Ján Smrek – poet
 Blanka Smreková – poet
 Ivan Stodola – writer
 Ján Šikura – historian
 Jozef Škultéty – administrator of Matica slovenská
 Pavol Socháň - writer and photographer
 Miloš Štefanovič – politician
 Fraňo Štefunko – sculptor
 Ivan Štubňa – painter
 Dušan Šulc – book graphic artist
 Izabela Textorisová – botany expert
 Ľudmila Turzová – author of an Atlas of Healing Plants
 Eduard Tvarožek – translator
 Marián Váross – artistic historian
 Jaroslav Vlček – literary historian
 Gorazd Zvonický – translator

Sources 

 
 
 Frantisek Zboray's Home Page
 Zdenko Ďuriška: Národný cintorín v Martine, Pomníky a osobnosti, MS, 2007

Martin, Slovakia
Cemeteries in Slovakia
National cemeteries
Buildings and structures in Žilina Region
Tourist attractions in Žilina Region